Conklin-Montgomery House is a historic home located at Cambridge City, Wayne County, Indiana.  It was built between about 1836 and 1838, and is a two-story, five bay, brick hip and end gable roofed townhouse.  It features a two-story, in antis, recessed portico with a second story balcony supported by Ionic order and Doric order columns. Also on the property is a contributing pre-American Civil War gazebo.

It was listed on the National Register of Historic Places in 1975. It is located in the Cambridge City Historic District.

References

External links

Historic American Buildings Survey in Indiana
Houses on the National Register of Historic Places in Indiana
Houses completed in 1838
Buildings and structures in Wayne County, Indiana
National Register of Historic Places in Wayne County, Indiana
Historic district contributing properties in Indiana